Mana Peak is a mountain in India, and the 5th highest located entirely within the Uttarakhand. Nanda Devi is the highest mountain in this category. There are two known approaches to Mana peak: one is the eastern approach through East Kamet glacier and the other is the southern approach through Nagthuni and Banke Kund glacier.

Mana Peak was first climbed solo in 1937 by Frank Smythe during his famous Valley of Flowers expedition.

References

Mountains of Uttarakhand